Research institute AMOLF is part of the institutes organization of the Dutch Research Council (NWO). AMOLF carries out fundamental research on the physics and design principles of natural and man-made complex matter. AMOLF uses these insights to create novel functional materials and find new solutions to societal challenges in renewable energy, green ICT and healthcare. AMOLF is located at the Amsterdam Science Park.

AMOLF used to be part of the Dutch Foundation for Fundamental Research on Matter (FOM). On 31 December 2016 FOM integrated in NWO.

History

The institute was established in 1949 by the government as the FOM Laboratory for Mass Spectrography. In 1960, it was renamed to Laboratory for Mass Separation, and in 1966 it was reorganized into a research institute and renamed FOM Institute for Atomic and Molecular Physics (AMOLF).

The original research goal was to demonstrate the separation of uranium isotopes by electromagnetic separation methods, a topic of great strategic importance after World War II. To reach this goal, a number of novelanalytical instrumentation were developed, starting with the development of mass-spectrometric tools. In 1953 AMOLF was the first European institute to successfully enrich Uranium. Soon after, research on thermal diffusion in gases followed, as did ultracentrifuge concepts, cathode dispersion, excitation of gases by using energetic ions and research on molecular beams. The gas-ultracentrifuge developed at AMOLF (under ) provided a base for the commercial enrichment of Uranium at the today well-known company of URENCO in Almelo.

Structure and organization 

AMOLF functions as an incubator for Dutch science, both in terms of launching new research themes and in terms of training talented scientists. AMOLF is headed by its director Huib Bakker, who succeeded  on 1 February 2016. The organization has 19 research groups headed by tenured or tenure-track group leaders. AMOLF employs about 130 researchers and 70 employees for technical and administrative support.

Research

AMOLF’s research program consists of four intertwined themes.

 Nanophotonics: controlling and manipulating light with structures at the nanometer scale
 Nanophotovoltaics: improving solar cells with nanomaterials
 Designer Matter: research and design of new smart materials
 Living Matter: research of biomaterials and multi-cellular systems

AMOLF publishes each year on average 15 PhD theses and over 120 papers.

Notable researchers
 Huib Bakker
 Marileen Dogterom (worked at AMOLF from 1997 to 2013)
 Daan Frenkel
 Ad Lagendijk
 Albert Polman

References

External links
AMOLF

Nanotechnology institutions
Organisations based in Amsterdam
Physics institutes
Research institutes in the Netherlands